"Remember This" is a song by American pop rock group Jonas Brothers. It was released as a single through Republic Records on June 18, 2021. The song was written by brothers Nick and Kevin, producers Ryan Tedder and The Monsters & Strangerz's group members Jordan K. Johnson, Stefan Johnson, and German, alongside songwriters Michael Pollack and Casey Smith. Nick and his brother, Joe, handle the vocals of the song. An NBC Olympics edition of the song was released August 8, 2021.

Background and composition
The Jonas Brothers announced a new fall tour, the Remember This Tour, on May 19, 2021. The tour will be accompanied by American country pop singer-songwriter Kelsea Ballerini. Through an Instagram story on the same day that the song was released, Nick Jonas announced that the song was recorded about two years before its release. The song debuted before the 2020 Summer Olympic Team Trials in the United States of America at 10:00 P.M. EST. The song is coincidental to the two-year anniversary of the band's single, "Greenlight" by Able Heart, for the American songwriting competition series, Songland, on NBC; the song was also produced by Ryan Tedder, the host of the series. On July 23, 2021, a portion of the "anthemic chorus" of the song, "Used to pray for a moment just like this / There's a fire in your eyes I can't resist / Baby we're gonna wanna remember this," was played during the 2020 Summer Olympics in Tokyo, Japan. "Remember This" can be described as "one of the group's most upbeat, undeniable, and uplifting anthems to date" and the "guitar echoes as percussive production ramps up towards the expansive and engaging chant" that starts off the chorus. There is an "In-Games" version of the song that contains different lyrics related to the Olympic Games and Team USA. It played during the Olympic Dreams featuring Jonas Brothers segment on July 21, 2021, two days prior to the opening ceremony.

A lyric video was published on the same day as its release.

Release and promotion
On May 23, 2021, the Jonas Brothers performed only the chorus of the song at the 2021 Billboard Music Awards; Nick Jonas also hosted the show that night. Four days later, the brothers appeared on The Late Late Show with James Corden on the night of May 26, 2021, in which the release date of the single was revealed. The brothers shared the cover art and release time of the song through social media on June 16, 2021.

Credits and personnel
Credits adapted from Tidal.

Jonas Brothers
 Nick Jonas – vocals, songwriting
 Joe Jonas – vocals
 Kevin Jonas – guitar, songwriting

Other musicians and technical
 Ryan Tedder – production, songwriting, background vocals, guitar
 The Monsters & Strangerz – production, songwriting, drums, keyboards, programming
 Jordan K. Johnson – production, songwriting, background vocals, drums, keyboards, programming
 Stefan Johnson – production, songwriting, background vocals, drums, keyboards, programming
 German – production, songwriting, drums, keyboards, programming
 Michael Pollack – songwriting, background vocals, keyboards
 Casey Smith – songwriting, background vocals
 Kenneth Jarvis III – A&R
 Wendy Goldstein – A&R
 Gian Stone – engineering, studio personnel
 Rich Rich – engineering, studio personnel
 Serban Ghenea – mixing, studio personnel
 Randy Merrill – mastering, studio personnel

Charts

Release history

References

2021 singles
2021 songs
Jonas Brothers songs
Songs written by Nick Jonas
Songs written by Kevin Jonas
Songs written by Ryan Tedder
Songs written by Jordan Johnson (songwriter)
Songs written by Stefan Johnson
Songs written by Michael Pollack (musician)
Song recordings produced by Ryan Tedder
Republic Records singles